Aerolane Líneas Aéreas Nacionales del Ecuador S.A. d/b/a LATAM Airlines Ecuador (formerly LAN Ecuador) is a subsidiary of LATAM Airlines Group, based in Quito, Ecuador. It is owned by Translloyd (55%) and LAN Airlines (45%).

History
LATAM Ecuador was established in July 2002 as LAN Ecuador and started operations on April 23, 2003 with two Boeing 767-300ERs operated by LAN Airlines.

In 2007 the airline became a member of the Oneworld alliance as a subsidiary of LAN Airlines. On December 24, 2008, LAN Ecuador received approval to begin domestic operations, which were launched by April 6, 2009, with the Airbus A318.

Destinations

Codeshare agreements
LATAM Ecuador codeshares with the following airlines:
Air Nostrum
Iberia

Fleet

Current fleet

As of July 2022, the LATAM Ecuador fleet consists of the following aircraft:

Former fleet
The airline previously operated the following aircraft:

See also
List of airlines of Ecuador

References

External links

Official website

Airlines of Ecuador
Latin American and Caribbean Air Transport Association
E
Former Oneworld affiliate members
Airlines established in 2002
2002 establishments in Ecuador